Turgut is a Turkish given name. Turgut may also refer to:

Given name
 Turgut Alp, Ottoman military commander
 Turgut Alp (fictional character), a character based on Turgut Alp in Diriliş: Ertuğrul
 Ankaralı Turgut (born 1963), Turkish singer
 Turgut Atakol (1915–1988), Turkish basketball player
 Turgut Aykaç (born 1958), former Turkish boxer
 Turgut Berkes (born 1953), Turkish rock musician, painter, and writer
 Turgut Doğan Şahin (born 1988), Turkish footballer
 Turgut Özatay (1927–2002), Turkish film actor
 Turgut Özal (1927–1993), Turkish president and political leader
 Turgut Polat (born 1953), Turkish table tennis player
 Turgut Reis (1485-1565), Turkish privateer and Ottoman admiral as well as Bey of Algiers; Beylerbey of the Mediterranean; and first Bey, later Pasha, of Tripoli
 Turgut Uçar (born 1964), Turkish football manager and coach
 Yasar Turgut Bilgin, (born 1957), Turkish author

Surname
 Azmi Turgut (born 1988), Turkish basketball player
 Jansin Turgut, rugby league footballer
 Şerif Turgut, Turkish woman war correspondent

Places
 Turgut, Çorum
 Turgut, Muğla, a town in Muğla Province, Turkey
 Turgutalp, a town in Soma district of Manisa Province, Turkey
 Turgutlu, a town and district of Manisa Province, Turkey
 Turgutlu, Kozan, a village in the Kozan district of Adana Province, Turkey
 Turgutreis, a town in Bodrum district of Muğla Province, Turkey

See also
 Turgot, a given name and surname

Turkish-language surnames
Turkish masculine given names